The Troisdorf Challenger, also known as the Saturn Oil Open for sponsorship reasons, is a professional tennis tournament played on clay courts. It is currently part of the Association of Tennis Professionals (ATP) Challenger Tour. It has been held in Troisdorf, Germany since 2022.

Past finals

Singles

Doubles

References

ATP Challenger Tour
Clay court tennis tournaments
Tennis tournaments in Germany